The 2012 European Championship of Ski Mountaineering was the ninth European Championship of ski mountaineering and was held in Pelvoux in the Massif des Écrins (France) from February 4, 2012 to February 10, 2012.

The competition, organized by the International Ski Mountaineering Federation (ISMF), was originally planned in Claut, Italy, for the year 2011, which was held at last as the 2011 World Championship of Ski Mountaineering. Due to this circumstance, the ninth edition of the European championships was the first held in an even-numbered year. It was the first edition including a sprint race.

Results

Nation ranking and medals 
(all age groups; without combined ranking medals)

Team 
Event held on February 5, 2012

List of the best 10 teams by gender:

Sprint 
Event held on February 6, 2012

List of the best 10 participants by gender:

Individual 
Event held on February 8, 2012

List of the best 10 participants by gender:

Vertical race 
Event held on February 9, 2012

List of the best 10 participants by gender:

Relay 
Event held on February 10, 2012

List of the best 10 teams by gender:

Combination ranking 
combined ranking (results of the individual, team and vertical race events)

List of the best 10 participants by gender:

External links 
 www.ski-ecrins.com

References 

2012
International sports competitions hosted by France
Championship of Ski Mountaineering
Hautes-Alpes
2012 in ski mountaineering
Skiing competitions in France